Ghushmeshwar is a Shiva temple, claimed by devotees to be the twelfth Jyotirlinga of Lord Shiva in the Hindu religion, which is located in the village of Shiwar, Rajasthan, India.

References

Shiva temples in Rajasthan
Hindu pilgrimage sites in India
Hindu temples in Sawai Madhopur